Jamie Lawrence may refer to:
 Jamie Lawrence (footballer, born 1970)
 Jamie Lawrence (footballer, born 2002)

See also
 James Lawrence (disambiguation)